Wendlingen is a town in the district of Esslingen in Baden-Württemberg in southern Germany. It is situated on the Neckar and Lauter rivers, 27 km southeast of Stuttgart.

The town grew in size, officially, on 1 April 1940, when three separate communities of Wendlingen, Unterboihingen and Bodelshofen merged.

The town also is the headquarters of the tool company Festool.

Mayors

 1940–1944: Andreas Bauer
 1944–1945: Emil Hartung
 1945–1945: Karl Strohmaier (commissarial)
 1945–1946: Rudolf Bisterfeld (commissarial)
 1946–1978: Helmut Kaiser
 1978–1992: Hans Köhler
 1992–2003: Andreas Hesky
 2003–2011: Frank Ziegler
 2011-2019: Steffen Weigel
 Since 2019: Steffen Weigel

Local council

The local council in Wendlingen has 22 members. The mayor is the president of the local council and has one vote. Communal elections in Baden-Württemberg 2014 had the following official results.

Notable people

 Marianne Erdrich-Sommer (born 1952), German politician (Bündnis 90/Die Grünen), former member of Landtag, Kreistagsabgeordnete, lives in Wendlingen
 Matthias Landfried (born 1975), German national table-tennis trainer
 Andrea Barth (born 1972), World champion, Europe champion, German champion in one wheel art cycling
 Werner Utter (1921–2006), chef-pilot of Lufthansa
 Erwin Behr (1857–1931), entrepreneur for furniture, first producer of wall units
 Robert Otto, manager of Heinrich Otto & Söhne company in Unterboihingen, first cotton spinning in Württemberg
 Alfred Kleefeldt, (born 1933), German athlete, competing in 5000 meters

International relations

Wendlingen is twinned with:
  – Dorog, Hungary
  – Saint-Leu-la-Forêt, France
  – Millstatt, Austria

References

Esslingen (district)
Württemberg
Populated places on the Neckar basin
Populated riverside places in Germany